Troia is a surname. Notable people with the surname include:

 Kathleen Troia McFarland (born 1951), American communications consultant
 Mariano Tullio Troia (1933–2010), member of the Sicilian Mafia
 Oliviero Troia (born 1994), Italian cyclist

See also

 Troia (disambiguation)
 Troja (surname)